Keith Wilkinson may refer to:

 Keith Wilkinson (musician), British musician who was the bassist for Squeeze
 Keith Wilkinson (reporter), British television reporter
 Keith Wilkinson (cricketer) (born 1950), former English cricketer